152 mm howitzer may refer to:
 152 mm howitzer M1910/37
 152-mm howitzer M1943 (D-1)
 152 mm towed gun-howitzer M1955 (D-20)
 152 mm ML-20 field howitzer
 Gun-howitzer M84 NORA
 152 mm siege gun M1910
 152 mm howitzer 2A65
 2S3 Akatsiya
 2S5 Giatsint-S
 2S19 Msta
 2A36 Giatsint-B

152 mm artillery